The Pepperdine Law Review is a student-edited law journal published by an independent student group composed of second- and third-year J.D. students at Pepperdine University School of Law. The Law Review publishes four to five issues a year and sponsors an annual symposium on a relevant legal topic. Since its founding in 1972, the Pepperdine Law Review has been a resource for practitioners, law professors, and judges alike. The Law Review has been cited several times by the United States Supreme Court, and is available on Westlaw and LexisNexis.

Membership 
Members of the Law Review are selected on the basis of academic excellence and participation in a rigorous selection process. Students in the top 10% of their first-year class may elect to join the journal's staff ("grading on"), and other students in the top 50% may seek membership by participating in an anonymously graded writing competition ("writing on").

Notable alumni 
Pepperdine Law Review Alumni have moved on to successful careers both in public service and private practice. The Pepperdine Law Review also has a strong tradition of sending its members to judicial clerkships across the country. Pepperdine Law Review alumni have clerked at all levels of the federal judiciary and several state courts.
Jeffrey S. Boyd, Volume 18 editor-in-chief: Justice of the Texas Supreme Court
Beverly Reid O'Connell, Volume 17 managing editor: Judge of the United States District Court for the Central District of California
Charles R. Eskridge, Judge of the United States District Court for the Southern District of Texas
James A. Gash, Volume 20 editor-in-chief: President of Pepperdine University

References

External links 
 

American law journals
General law journals
Law journals edited by students
Publications established in 1973
English-language journals
Pepperdine University
5 times per year journals